Anemia or anaemia (British English) is a blood disorder in which the blood has a reduced ability to carry oxygen due to a lower than normal number of red blood cells, or a reduction in the amount of hemoglobin. 
When anemia comes on slowly, the symptoms are often vague, such as tiredness, weakness, shortness of breath, headaches, and a reduced ability to exercise. When anemia is acute, symptoms may include confusion, feeling like one is going to pass out, loss of consciousness, and increased thirst. Anemia must be significant before a person becomes noticeably pale. Symptoms of anemia depend on how quickly hemoglobin decreases. Additional symptoms may occur depending on the underlying cause. Preoperative anemia can increase the risk of needing a blood transfusion following surgery. Anemia can be temporary or long term and can range from mild to severe.

Anemia can be caused by blood loss, decreased red blood cell production, and increased red blood cell breakdown. Causes of bleeding include bleeding due to inflammation of the stomach or intestines, bleeding from surgery, serious injury, or blood donation. Causes of decreased production include iron deficiency, vitamin B12 deficiency, thalassemia and a number of bone marrow tumors. Causes of increased breakdown include genetic disorders such as sickle cell anemia, infections such as malaria, and certain autoimmune diseases. Anemia can also be classified based on the size of the red blood cells and amount of hemoglobin in each cell. If the cells are small, it is called microcytic anemia; if they are large, it is called macrocytic anemia; and if they are normal sized, it is called normocytic anemia. The diagnosis of anemia in men is based on a hemoglobin of less than 130 to 140 g/L (13 to 14 g/dL); in women, it is less than 120 to 130 g/L (12 to 13 g/dL). Further testing is then required to determine the cause.

A large number of patients diagnosed with anemia of chronic disease present with no active inflammation or dietary issues. These include many with reduced limb loading, such as spinal cord injured patients, astronauts, elderly people with limited mobility, bed-bound and experimental bed-rest subjects.

Certain groups of individuals, such as pregnant women, benefit from the use of iron pills for prevention. Dietary supplementation, without determining the specific cause, is not recommended. The use of blood transfusions is typically based on a person's signs and symptoms. In those without symptoms, they are not recommended unless hemoglobin levels are less than 60 to 80 g/L (6 to 8 g/dL). These recommendations may also apply to some people with acute bleeding. Erythropoiesis-stimulating agents are only recommended in those with severe anemia.

Anemia is the most common blood disorder, affecting about a third of the global population. Iron-deficiency anemia affects nearly 1 billion people. In 2013, anemia due to iron deficiency resulted in about 183,000 deaths – down from 213,000 deaths in 1990. This condition is most prevalent in children with also an above average prevalence in elderly and women of reproductive age (especially during pregnancy). 

Anemia is one of the six WHO global nutrition targets for 2025 and for diet-related global targets endorsed by World Health Assembly in 2012 and 2013. Efforts to reach global targets contribute to reaching Sustainable Development Goals (SDGs), with anemia as one of the targets in SDG 2 for achieving zero world hunger.

Signs and symptoms
 
A person with anemia may not have any symptoms, depending on the underlying cause, and no symptoms may be noticed, as the anemia is initially mild, and then the symptoms become worse as the anemia worsens. A patient with anemia may report feeling tired, weak, decreased ability to concentrate, and sometimes shortness of breath on exertion.

Symptoms of anemia can come on quickly or slowly. Early on there may be few or no symptoms. If the anemia continues slowly (chronic), the body may adapt and compensate for this change. In this case, no symptoms may appear until the anemia becomes more severe. Symptoms can include feeling tired, weak, dizziness, headaches, intolerance to physical exertion, shortness of breath, difficulty concentrating, irregular or rapid heartbeat, cold hands and feet, cold intolerance, pale or yellow skin, poor appetite, easy bruising and bleeding, and muscle weakness. Anemia that develops quickly, often, has more severe symptoms, including, feeling faint, chest pain, sweating, increased thirst, and confusion. There may be also additional symptoms depending on the underlying cause.

In more severe anemia, the body may compensate for the lack of oxygen-carrying capability of the blood by increasing cardiac output. The person may have symptoms related to this, such as palpitations, angina (if pre-existing heart disease is present), intermittent claudication of the legs, and symptoms of heart failure.

On examination, the signs exhibited may include pallor (pale skin, mucosa, conjunctiva and nail beds), but this is not a reliable sign. A blue coloration of the sclera may be noticed in some cases of iron-deficiency anemia. There may be signs of specific causes of anemia, e.g. koilonychia (in iron deficiency), jaundice (when anemia results from abnormal break down of red blood cells – in hemolytic anemia), nerve cell damage (vitamin B12 deficiency), bone deformities (found in thalassemia major) or leg ulcers (seen in sickle-cell disease). In severe anemia, there may be signs of a hyperdynamic circulation: tachycardia (a fast heart rate), bounding pulse, flow murmurs, and cardiac ventricular hypertrophy (enlargement). There may be signs of heart failure.
Pica, the consumption of non-food items such as ice, paper, wax, grass, hair or dirt, may be a symptom of iron deficiency; although it occurs often in those who have normal levels of hemoglobin.
Chronic anemia may result in behavioral disturbances in children as a direct result of impaired neurological development in infants, and reduced academic performance in children of school age. Restless legs syndrome is more common in people with iron-deficiency anemia than in the general population.

Causes

The causes of anemia may be classified as impaired red blood cell (RBC) production, increased RBC destruction (hemolytic anemia), blood loss and fluid overload (hypervolemia). Several of these may interplay to cause anemia. The most common cause of anemia is blood loss, but this usually does not cause any lasting symptoms unless a relatively impaired RBC production develops, in turn, most commonly by iron deficiency.

Impaired production
 Disturbance of proliferation and differentiation of stem cells
 Pure red cell aplasia
 Aplastic anemia affects all kinds of blood cells. Fanconi anemia is a hereditary disorder or defect featuring aplastic anemia and various other abnormalities.
 Anemia of kidney failure due to insufficient production of the hormone erythropoietin
 Anemia of endocrine disease
 Disturbance of proliferation and maturation of erythroblasts
 Pernicious anemia is a form of megaloblastic anemia due to vitamin B12 deficiency dependent on impaired absorption of vitamin B12. Lack of dietary B12 causes non-pernicious megaloblastic anemia.
 Anemia of folate deficiency, as with vitamin B12, causes megaloblastic anemia
 Anemia of prematurity, by diminished erythropoietin response to declining hematocrit levels, combined with blood loss from laboratory testing, generally occurs in premature infants at two to six weeks of age.
 Iron deficiency anemia, resulting in deficient heme synthesis
 Thalassemias, causing deficient globin synthesis
 Congenital dyserythropoietic anemias, causing ineffective erythropoiesis
 Anemia of kidney failure (also causing stem cell dysfunction)
 Other mechanisms of impaired RBC production
 Myelophthisic anemia or myelophthisis is a severe type of anemia resulting from the replacement of bone marrow by other materials, such as malignant tumors, fibrosis, or granulomas.
 Myelodysplastic syndrome
 anemia of chronic inflammation
 Leukoerythroblastic anemia is caused by space-occupying lesions in the bone marrow that prevent normal production of blood cells.

Increased destruction

Anemias of increased red blood cell destruction are generally classified as hemolytic anemias. These types generally feature jaundice, and elevated levels of lactate dehydrogenase.
 Intrinsic (intracorpuscular) abnormalities cause premature destruction. All of these, except paroxysmal nocturnal hemoglobinuria, are hereditary genetic disorders.
 Hereditary spherocytosis is a hereditary defect that results in defects in the RBC cell membrane, causing the erythrocytes to be sequestered and destroyed by the spleen.
 Hereditary elliptocytosis is another defect in membrane skeleton proteins.
 Abetalipoproteinemia, causing defects in membrane lipids
 Enzyme deficiencies
 Pyruvate kinase and hexokinase deficiencies, causing defect glycolysis
 Glucose-6-phosphate dehydrogenase deficiency and glutathione synthetase deficiency, causing increased oxidative stress
 Hemoglobinopathies
 Sickle cell anemia
 Hemoglobinopathies causing unstable hemoglobins
 Paroxysmal nocturnal hemoglobinuria
 Extrinsic (extracorpuscular) abnormalities
 Antibody-mediated
 Warm autoimmune hemolytic anemia is caused by autoimmune attack against red blood cells, primarily by IgG. It is the most common of the autoimmune hemolytic diseases. It can be idiopathic, that is, without any known cause, drug-associated or secondary to another disease such as systemic lupus erythematosus, or a malignancy, such as chronic lymphocytic leukemia.
 Cold agglutinin hemolytic anemia is primarily mediated by IgM. It can be idiopathic or result from an underlying condition.
 Rh disease, one of the causes of hemolytic disease of the newborn
 Transfusion reaction to blood transfusions
 Mechanical trauma to red blood cells
 Microangiopathic hemolytic anemias, including thrombotic thrombocytopenic purpura and disseminated intravascular coagulation
 Infections, including malaria
 Heart surgery
 Haemodialysis
 Parasitic
 Trypanosoma congolense alters the surfaces of RBCs of its host and this may explain T. c. induced anemia

Blood loss
 Anemia of prematurity, from frequent blood sampling for laboratory testing, combined with insufficient RBC production
 Trauma or surgery, causing acute blood loss
 Gastrointestinal tract lesions, causing either acute bleeds (e.g. variceal lesions, peptic ulcers) or chronic blood loss (e.g. angiodysplasia)
 Gynecologic disturbances, also generally causing chronic blood loss
 From menstruation, mostly among young women or older women who have fibroids
 Many type of cancers, including colorectal cancer and cancer of the urinary bladder, may cause acute or chronic blood loss, especially at advanced stages
 Infection by intestinal nematodes feeding on blood, such as hookworms and the whipworm Trichuris trichiura 
 Iatrogenic anemia, blood loss from repeated blood draws and medical procedures.

The roots of the words anemia and ischemia both refer to the basic idea of "lack of blood", but anemia and ischemia are not the same thing in modern medical terminology. The word anemia used alone implies widespread effects from blood that either is too scarce (e.g., blood loss) or is dysfunctional in its oxygen-supplying ability (due to whatever type of hemoglobin or erythrocyte problem). In contrast, the word ischemia refers solely to the lack of blood (poor perfusion). Thus ischemia in a body part can cause localized anemic effects within those tissues.

Fluid overload
Fluid overload (hypervolemia) causes decreased hemoglobin concentration and apparent anemia:
 General causes of hypervolemia include excessive sodium or fluid intake, sodium or water retention and fluid shift into the intravascular space.
 From the 6th week of pregnancy, hormonal changes cause an increase in the mother's blood volume due to an increase in plasma.

Intestinal inflammation
Certain gastrointestinal disorders can cause anemia. The mechanisms involved are multifactorial and not limited to malabsorption but mainly related to chronic intestinal inflammation, which causes dysregulation of hepcidin that leads to decreased access of iron to the circulation.
 Helicobacter pylori infection.
 Gluten-related disorders: untreated celiac disease and non-celiac gluten sensitivity. Anemia can be the only manifestation of celiac disease, in absence of gastrointestinal or any other symptoms.
 Inflammatory bowel disease.

Diagnosis

Definitions
There are a number of definitions of anemia; reviews provide comparison and contrast of them. A strict but broad definition is an absolute decrease in red blood cell mass, however, a broader definition is a lowered ability of the blood to carry oxygen. An operational definition is a decrease in whole-blood hemoglobin concentration of more than 2 standard deviations below the mean of an age- and sex-matched reference range.

It is difficult to directly measure RBC mass, so the hematocrit (amount of RBCs) or the hemoglobin (Hb) in the blood are often used instead to indirectly estimate the value. Hematocrit; however, is concentration dependent and is therefore not completely accurate. For example, during pregnancy a woman's RBC mass is normal but because of an increase in blood volume the hemoglobin and hematocrit are diluted and thus decreased. Another example would be bleeding where the RBC mass would decrease but the concentrations of hemoglobin and hematocrit initially remains normal until fluids shift from other areas of the body to the intravascular space.

The anemia is also classified by severity into mild (110 g/L to normal), moderate (80 g/L to 110 g/L), and severe anemia (less than 80 g/L) in adults. Different values are used in pregnancy and children.

Testing
Anemia is typically diagnosed on a complete blood count. Apart from reporting the number of red blood cells and the hemoglobin level, the automatic counters also measure the size of the red blood cells by flow cytometry, which is an important tool in distinguishing between the causes of anemia. Examination of a stained blood smear using a microscope can also be helpful, and it is sometimes a necessity in regions of the world where automated analysis is less accessible.

A blood test will provide counts of white blood cells, red blood cells and platelets. If anemia appears, further tests may determine what type it is, and whether it has a serious cause. although of that, it is possible to refer to the genetic history and physical diagnosis. These tests may include:
 complete blood count (CBC); a CBC is used to count the number of blood cells in a sample of the blood. For anemia, it will likely to be interested in the levels of the red blood cells contained in blood (hematocrit), hemoglobin, mean corpuscular volume.
 determine the size and shape of red blood cells; some of red blood cells might also be examined for unusual size, shape and color.
 serum ferritin; This protein helps store iron in the body, a low levels of ferritin usually indicates a low levels of stored iron.
 serum vitamin B12; low levels usually develop an anemia, vitamin B12 is needed to make red blood cells, which carry oxygen to all parts of human body.
 blood tests to detect rare causes; such as an immune attack on red blood cells, red blood cell fragility, and defects of enzymes, hemoglobin, and clotting.
 a bone marrow sample; when the cause is unclear, a bone marrow test is performed, most often, when some blood cell defect is suspected.

Reticulocyte counts, and the "kinetic" approach to anemia, have become more common than in the past in the large medical centers of the United States and some other wealthy nations, in part because some automatic counters now have the capacity to include reticulocyte counts. A reticulocyte count is a quantitative measure of the bone marrow's production of new red blood cells. The reticulocyte production index is a calculation of the ratio between the level of anemia and the extent to which the reticulocyte count has risen in response. If the degree of anemia is significant, even a "normal" reticulocyte count actually may reflect an inadequate response.
If an automated count is not available, a reticulocyte count can be done manually following special staining of the blood film. In manual examination, activity of the bone marrow can also be gauged qualitatively by subtle changes in the numbers and the morphology of young RBCs by examination under a microscope. Newly formed RBCs are usually slightly larger than older RBCs and show polychromasia. Even where the source of blood loss is obvious, evaluation of erythropoiesis can help assess whether the bone marrow will be able to compensate for the loss and at what rate.
When the cause is not obvious, clinicians use other tests, such as: ESR, serum iron, transferrin, RBC folate level, hemoglobin electrophoresis, renal function tests (e.g. serum creatinine) although the tests will depend on the clinical hypothesis that is being investigated.
When the diagnosis remains difficult, a bone marrow examination allows direct examination of the precursors to red cells, although is rarely used as is painful, invasive and is hence reserved for cases where severe pathology needs to be determined or excluded.

Red blood cell size
In the morphological approach, anemia is classified by the size of red blood cells; this is either done automatically or on microscopic examination of a peripheral blood smear. The size is reflected in the mean corpuscular volume (MCV). If the cells are smaller than normal (under 80 fl), the anemia is said to be microcytic; if they are normal size (80–100 fl), normocytic; and if they are larger than normal (over 100 fl), the anemia is classified as macrocytic. This scheme quickly exposes some of the most common causes of anemia; for instance, a microcytic anemia is often the result of iron deficiency. In clinical workup, the MCV will be one of the first pieces of information available, so even among clinicians who consider the "kinetic" approach more useful philosophically, morphology will remain an important element of classification and diagnosis.
Limitations of MCV include cases where the underlying cause is due to a combination of factors – such as iron deficiency (a cause of microcytosis) and vitamin B12 deficiency (a cause of macrocytosis) where the net result can be normocytic cells.

Production vs. destruction or loss
The "kinetic" approach to anemia yields arguably the most clinically relevant classification of anemia. This classification depends on evaluation of several hematological parameters, particularly the blood reticulocyte (precursor of mature RBCs) count. This then yields the classification of defects by decreased RBC production versus increased RBC destruction or loss. Clinical signs of loss or destruction include abnormal peripheral blood smear with signs of hemolysis; elevated LDH suggesting cell destruction; or clinical signs of bleeding, such as guaiac-positive stool, radiographic findings, or frank bleeding.
The following is a simplified schematic of this approach:

* For instance, sickle cell anemia with superimposed iron deficiency; chronic gastric bleeding with B12 and folate deficiency; and other instances of anemia with more than one cause.
** Confirm by repeating reticulocyte count: ongoing combination of low reticulocyte production index, normal MCV and hemolysis or loss may be seen in bone marrow failure or anemia of chronic disease, with superimposed or related hemolysis or blood loss.
Here is a schematic representation of how to consider anemia with MCV as the starting point:

Other characteristics visible on the peripheral smear may provide valuable clues about a more specific diagnosis; for example, abnormal white blood cells may point to a cause in the bone marrow.

Microcytic

Microcytic anemia is primarily a result of hemoglobin synthesis failure/insufficiency, which could be caused by several etiologies:

Iron deficiency anemia is the most common type of anemia overall and it has many causes. RBCs often appear hypochromic (paler than usual) and microcytic (smaller than usual) when viewed with a microscope.
 Iron deficiency anemia is due to insufficient dietary intake or absorption of iron to meet the body's needs. Infants, toddlers, and pregnant women have higher than average needs. Increased iron intake is also needed to offset blood losses due to digestive tract issues, frequent blood donations, or heavy menstrual periods. Iron is an essential part of hemoglobin, and low iron levels result in decreased incorporation of hemoglobin into red blood cells. In the United States, 12% of all women of childbearing age have iron deficiency, compared with only 2% of adult men. The incidence is as high as 20% among African American and Mexican American women. Studies have shown iron deficiency without anemia causes poor school performance and lower IQ in teenage girls, although this may be due to socioeconomic factors. Iron deficiency is the most prevalent deficiency state on a worldwide basis. It is sometimes the cause of abnormal fissuring of the angular (corner) sections of the lips (angular stomatitis).
 In the United States, the most common cause of iron deficiency is bleeding or blood loss, usually from the gastrointestinal tract. Fecal occult blood testing, upper endoscopy and lower endoscopy should be performed to identify bleeding lesions. In older men and women, the chances are higher that bleeding from the gastrointestinal tract could be due to colon polyps or colorectal cancer.
 Worldwide, the most common cause of iron deficiency anemia is parasitic infestation (hookworms, amebiasis, schistosomiasis and whipworms).
The Mentzer index (mean cell volume divided by the RBC count) predicts whether microcytic anemia may be due to iron deficiency or thalassemia, although it requires confirmation.

Macrocytic

 Megaloblastic anemia, the most common cause of macrocytic anemia, is due to a deficiency of either vitamin B12, folic acid, or both. Deficiency in folate or vitamin B12 can be due either to inadequate intake or insufficient absorption. Folate deficiency normally does not produce neurological symptoms, while B12 deficiency does.
 Pernicious anemia is caused by a lack of intrinsic factor, which is required to absorb vitamin B12 from food. A lack of intrinsic factor may arise from an autoimmune condition targeting the parietal cells (atrophic gastritis) that produce intrinsic factor or against intrinsic factor itself. These lead to poor absorption of vitamin B12.
 Macrocytic anemia can also be caused by the removal of the functional portion of the stomach, such as during gastric bypass surgery, leading to reduced vitamin B12/folate absorption. Therefore, one must always be aware of anemia following this procedure.
 Hypothyroidism
 Alcoholism commonly causes a macrocytosis, although not specifically anemia. Other types of liver disease can also cause macrocytosis.
 Drugs such as methotrexate, zidovudine, and other substances may inhibit DNA replication such as heavy metals
Macrocytic anemia can be further divided into "megaloblastic anemia" or "nonmegaloblastic macrocytic anemia". The cause of megaloblastic anemia is primarily a failure of DNA synthesis with preserved RNA synthesis, which results in restricted cell division of the progenitor cells. The megaloblastic anemias often present with neutrophil hypersegmentation (six to 10 lobes). The nonmegaloblastic macrocytic anemias have different etiologies (i.e. unimpaired DNA globin synthesis,) which occur, for example, in alcoholism.
In addition to the nonspecific symptoms of anemia, specific features of vitamin B12 deficiency include peripheral neuropathy and subacute combined degeneration of the cord with resulting balance difficulties from posterior column spinal cord pathology. Other features may include a smooth, red tongue and glossitis.
The treatment for vitamin B12-deficient anemia was first devised by William Murphy, who bled dogs to make them anemic, and then fed them various substances to see what (if anything) would make them healthy again. He discovered that ingesting large amounts of liver seemed to cure the disease. George Minot and George Whipple then set about to isolate the curative substance chemically and ultimately were able to isolate the vitamin B12 from the liver. All three shared the 1934 Nobel Prize in Medicine.

Normocytic

Normocytic anemia occurs when the overall hemoglobin levels are decreased, but the red blood cell size (mean corpuscular volume) remains normal. Causes include:

Dimorphic
A dimorphic appearance on a peripheral blood smear occurs when there are two simultaneous populations of red blood cells, typically of different size and hemoglobin content (this last feature affecting the color of the red blood cell on a stained peripheral blood smear). For example, a person recently transfused for iron deficiency would have small, pale, iron deficient red blood cells (RBCs) and the donor RBCs of normal size and color. Similarly, a person transfused for severe folate or vitamin B12 deficiency would have two cell populations, but, in this case, the patient's RBCs would be larger and paler than the donor's RBCs. A person with sideroblastic anemia (a defect in heme synthesis, commonly caused by alcoholism, but also drugs/toxins, nutritional deficiencies, a few acquired and rare congenital diseases) can have a dimorphic smear from the sideroblastic anemia alone. Evidence for multiple causes appears with an elevated RBC distribution width (RDW), indicating a wider-than-normal range of red cell sizes, also seen in common nutritional anemia.

Heinz body anemia
Heinz bodies form in the cytoplasm of RBCs and appear as small dark dots under the microscope. In animals, Heinz body anemia has many causes. It may be drug-induced, for example in cats and dogs by acetaminophen (paracetamol), or may be caused by eating various plants or other substances:
 In cats and dogs after eating either raw or cooked plants from the genus Allium, for example, onions or garlic.
 In dogs after ingestion of zinc, for example, after eating U.S. pennies minted after 1982.
 In horses which eat dry or wilted red maple leaves.

Hyperanemia
Hyperanemia is a severe form of anemia, in which the hematocrit is below 10%.

Refractory anemia
Refractory anemia, an anemia which does not respond to treatment, is often seen secondary to myelodysplastic syndromes. Iron deficiency anemia may also be refractory as a manifestation of gastrointestinal problems which disrupt iron absorption or cause occult bleeding.

Transfusion dependent
Transfusion dependent anemia is a form of anemia where ongoing blood transfusion are required. Most people with myelodysplastic syndrome develop this state at some point in time. Beta thalassemia may also result in transfusion dependence. Concerns from repeated blood transfusions include iron overload. This iron overload may require chelation therapy.

Treatment
Treatment for anemia depends on cause and severity. Vitamin supplements given orally (folic acid or vitamin B12) or intramuscularly (vitamin B12) will replace specific deficiencies.

Oral iron

Nutritional iron deficiency is common in developing nations. An estimated two-thirds of children and of women of childbearing age in most developing nations are estimated to have iron deficiency without anemia; one-third of them have iron deficiency with anemia. Iron deficiency due to inadequate dietary iron intake is rare in men and postmenopausal women. The diagnosis of iron deficiency mandates a search for potential sources of blood loss, such as gastrointestinal bleeding from ulcers or colon cancer.

Mild to moderate iron-deficiency anemia is treated by oral iron supplementation with ferrous sulfate, ferrous fumarate, or ferrous gluconate. Daily iron supplements have been shown to be effective in reducing anemia in women of childbearing age. When taking iron supplements, stomach upset or darkening of the feces are commonly experienced. The stomach upset can be alleviated by taking the iron with food; however, this decreases the amount of iron absorbed. Vitamin C aids in the body's ability to absorb iron, so taking oral iron supplements with orange juice is of benefit.

In the anemia of chronic kidney disease, recombinant erythropoietin or epoetin alfa is recommended to stimulate RBC production, and if iron deficiency and inflammation are also present, concurrent parenteral iron is also recommended.

Injectable iron
In cases where oral iron has either proven ineffective, would be too slow (for example, pre-operatively), or where absorption is impeded (for example in cases of inflammation), parenteral iron preparations can be used. Parenteral iron can improve iron stores rapidly and is also effective for treating people with postpartum haemorrhage, inflammatory bowel disease, and chronic heart failure. The body can absorb up to 6 mg iron daily from the gastrointestinal tract. In many cases, the patient has a deficit of over 1,000 mg of iron which would require several months to replace. This can be given concurrently with erythropoietin to ensure sufficient iron for increased rates of erythropoiesis.

Blood transfusions
Blood transfusions in those without symptoms is not recommended until the hemoglobin is below 60 to 80 g/L (6 to 8 g/dL). In those with coronary artery disease who are not actively bleeding transfusions are only recommended when the hemoglobin is below 70 to 80g/L (7 to 8 g/dL). Transfusing earlier does not improve survival. Transfusions otherwise should only be undertaken in cases of cardiovascular instability.

A 2012 review concluded that when considering blood transfusions for anaemia in people with advanced cancer who have fatigue and breathlessness (not related to cancer treatment or haemorrhage), consideration should be given to whether there are alternative strategies can be tried before a blood transfusion.

Vitamin B12 intramuscular injections 
In many cases, vitamin B12 is used by intramuscular injection in severe cases or cases of malabsorption of dietary-B12. Pernicious anemia caused by loss of intrinsic factor cannot be prevented. If there are other, reversible causes of low vitamin B12 levels, the cause must be treated.

Vitamin B12 deficiency anemia is usually easily treated by providing the necessary level of vitamin B12 supplementation. The injections are quick-acting, and symptoms usually go away within one to two weeks. As the condition improves, doses are reduced to weeks and then can be given monthly. Intramuscular therapy leads to more rapid improvement and should be considered in patients with severe deficiency or severe neurologic symptoms. Treatment should begin rapidly for severe neurological symptoms, as some changes can become permanent. In some individuals lifelong treatment may be needed.

Erythropoiesis-stimulating agents
The objective for the administration of an erythropoiesis-stimulating agent (ESA) is to maintain hemoglobin at the lowest level that both minimizes transfusions and meets the individual person's needs. They should not be used for mild or moderate anemia. They are not recommended in people with chronic kidney disease unless hemoglobin levels are less than 10 g/dL or they have symptoms of anemia. Their use should be along with parenteral iron. The 2020 Cochrane Anaesthesia Review Group review of Erythropoietin plus iron versus control treatment including placebo or iron for preoperative anaemic adults undergoing non‐cardiac surgery  demonstrated that patients were much less likely to require red cell transfusion and in those transfused, the volumes were unchanged (mean difference -0.09, 95% CI -0.23 to 0.05). Pre-op Hb concentration was increased in those receiving 'high dose' EPO, but not 'low dose'.

Hyperbaric oxygen
Treatment of exceptional blood loss (anemia) is recognized as an indication for hyperbaric oxygen (HBO) by the Undersea and Hyperbaric Medical Society. The use of HBO is indicated when oxygen delivery to tissue is not sufficient in patients who cannot be given blood transfusions for medical or religious reasons. HBO may be used for medical reasons when threat of blood product incompatibility or concern for transmissible disease are factors. The beliefs of some religions (ex: Jehovah's Witnesses) may require they use the HBO method. A 2005 review of the use of HBO in severe anemia found all publications reported positive results.

Preoperative anemia 
An estimated 30% of adults who require non-cardiac surgery have anemia. In order to determine an appropriate preoperative treatment, it is suggested that the cause of anemia be first determined. There is moderate level medical evidence that supports a combination of iron supplementation and erythropoietin treatment to help reduce the requirement for red blood cell transfusions after surgery in those who have preoperative anemia.

Epidemiology
Anemia affects 27% of the world's population with iron-deficiency anemia accounting for more than 60% of it. A moderate degree of iron-deficiency anemia affected approximately 610 million people worldwide or 8.8% of the population. It is somewhat more common in females (9.9%) than males (7.8%). Mild iron deficiency anemia affects another 375 million. Severe anaemia is prevalent globally, and especially in sub-Saharan Africa where it is associated with infections including malaria and invasive bacterial infections.

History

Signs of severe anemia in human bones from 4000 years ago have been uncovered in Thailand.

References

External links 

 Anemia, U.S. National Library of Medicine

[About Anemia]

Anemias
Hematopathology
Wikipedia medicine articles ready to translate
Wikipedia emergency medicine articles ready to translate
Transfusion medicine